Fistulectomy is a surgical procedure where a fistulous tract is excised (cut out) completely. This is compared with fistulotomy, where the fistulous tract is merely laid open to heal.

Fistulae are a feature of many diseases, but commonly fistulectomy refers to an operation for an anal fistula (fistula-in-ano). Fistulectomy removes secondary fistulous tracts compared to fistulotomy, but fistulotomy has shorter healing times and less chance of damage to the sphincters.

See also
 Anal fistula
 perianal abscess
 Crohn's disease

References

Surgical procedures and techniques